Kevin McGowne (born 16 December 1969 in Kilmarnock) is a Scottish former professional footballer.

Kevin McGowne was a defender who began his career at St Mirren in 1991. He joined St Johnstone in 1992 and spent four seasons with the saints before being signed by Kilmarnock by Alex Totten.

He spent six years with Kilmarnock and helped them lift the 1997 Scottish Cup after beating Falkirk in the final. Dundee United was his next destination in 2002 but he spent just one season at Tannadice, making 12 league appearances.

He had a short spell with Partick Thistle in 2003 before re-joining St Mirren the same year. He helped St Mirren return to the Scottish Premier League by winning promotion in 2005–06. He also played as St Mirren won the 2005 Scottish Challenge Cup Final against Hamilton Academical.

McGowne left St Mirren in July 2007 after helping the club retain their SPL status in 2006–07. He joined Montrose, where he was also assistant manager to Jim Weir. McGowne left Montrose in October 2008.

He followed Weir to Arbroath as assistant manager for the 2009–2010 season, and then in May 2010 to Brechin City.

References

External links

1969 births
Living people
Footballers from Kilmarnock
Association football central defenders
Scottish footballers
St Mirren F.C. players
St Johnstone F.C. players
Kilmarnock F.C. players
Dundee United F.C. players
Partick Thistle F.C. players
Montrose F.C. players
Scottish Premier League players
Scottish Football League players